Walter Joseph Cummings Jr. (September 29, 1916 – April 24, 1999) was a United States Solicitor General and a United States circuit judge of the United States Court of Appeals for the Seventh Circuit.

Education and career

Born September 29, 1916, in Chicago, Illinois, Cummings received a Bachelor of Arts degree in 1937 from Yale University and a Bachelor of Laws in 1940 from Harvard Law School. At Yale, he served on the business staff of campus humor magazine The Yale Record with Roy D. Chapin Jr. and James S. Copley. He served as Assistant Solicitor General and Special Assistant Attorney General at the United States Department of Justice from 1940 to 1946. He was in private practice in Chicago from 1946 to 1966. He served as United States Solicitor General from 1952 to 1953.

Solicitor General service

In 1946, Cummings joined the Chicago law firm now known as Sidley Austin as a partner. He remained at the firm until 1966, taking his only leave of absence to become Solicitor General of the United States after President Truman’s December 1, 1952 appointment. At age 36, Cummings was the youngest Solicitor general to serve in the position. His short Solicitor General service (from December 1952–March 1953) was during the transitional period between the presidencies of Harry S. Truman and Dwight D. Eisenhower. Cummings only appeared before the Supreme Court in matters concerning alleged violations of the civil rights of convicts in a Florida prison camp and a question concerning the constitutionality of the emergency strike section of the Taft-Hartley Act.

Federal judicial service

Cummings was nominated by President Lyndon B. Johnson on July 11, 1966, to the United States Court of Appeals for the Seventh Circuit, to a new seat authorized by 80 Stat. 75. He was confirmed by the United States Senate on August 10, 1966, and received his commission on August 11, 1966. He served as Chief Judge and as a member of the Judicial Conference of the United States from 1981 to 1986. His service terminated on April 24, 1999, due to his death in Chicago.  He was the last federal appeals court judge in active service to have been appointed by President Johnson.

Notable cases

In Sprogis v. United Airlines (1971), Cummings ruled that United Airlines's requirement that female employees be unmarried but allowing male employees to be married constitutes sex discrimination and violates Title VII of the Civil Rights Act. 

In 1979, Cummings ruled in Carroll v. Talman Federal Savings And Loan Association of Chicago that requiring female employees to wear uniforms while allowing male employees to wear suits of their choice constitutes sex discrimination. Cummings cited his earlier ruling in Sprogis for his ruling in Carroll.

References

Sources
 
 

|-

|-

1916 births
1999 deaths
20th-century American judges
Harvard Law School alumni
Judges of the United States Court of Appeals for the Seventh Circuit
Lawyers from Chicago
United States court of appeals judges appointed by Lyndon B. Johnson
United States Solicitors General
Yale University alumni